Ernst Budig (1 January 1908 – 29 December 1971) was a German swimmer. He competed in the men's 200 metre breaststroke event at the 1928 Summer Olympics.

References

1908 births
1971 deaths
German male swimmers
Olympic swimmers of Germany
Swimmers at the 1928 Summer Olympics
Sportspeople from Cologne
20th-century German people